23S rRNA (adenosine1067-2'-O)-methyltransferase (23S rRNA A1067 2'-methyltransferase, thiostrepton-resistance methylase, nosiheptide-resistance methyltransferase) is an enzyme with systematic name S-adenosyl-L-methionine:23S rRNA (adenosine1067-2'-O)-methyltransferase. This enzyme catalyses the following chemical reaction

 S-adenosyl-L-methionine + adenosine1067 in 23S rRNA  S-adenosyl-L-homocysteine + 2'-O-methyladenosine1067 in 23S rRNA

The methylase that is responsible for autoimmunity in the thiostrepton producer Streptomyces azureus.

References

External links 
 

EC 2.1.1